Thiruvenkatanathapuram is a village with a temple located approximately  from Tirunelveli, a district headquarters in Tamil Nadu, South India.  The village is located on a hillock and the temple is located at an elevated plane surface.  There are three roads from Tirunelveli, and daily bus service is available to the temple entrance.

Temple

The village has a temple situated on the bank of the Thamirabarani River.  The temple is named "Sengani" ("Sen" meaning "Red" and "Kani" meaning "Land" in Tamil), owing to the red colour of the soil surrounding it. The name was gradually changed to "Sangani".  It was built by King Verapandian in the twelfth century.

On the northern side of the temple lies the Kubera vassal, which is the main entrance. A bamboo tree serves the sthala virusha (Main tree of the temple).

Tirunelveli
Villages in Tirunelveli district